Lieutenant-Colonel Richard Lyons Otway Pearson  (1831–30 May 1890) was Assistant Commissioner (Executive) of the London Metropolitan Police from 1881 to 1890.

Pearson was the son of Henry Shepherd Pearson and Caroline Lyons, daughter of John Lyons of Antigua and sister of Edmund Lyons, 1st Baron Lyons.

He was educated at Eton College and the Royal Military College, Sandhurst. He was commissioned into the Grenadier Guards. During the Crimean War (1854–1855), he served as aide-de-camp to General Sir George Brown, and was present at Alma, Inkerman and Sebastopol. 

In 1856, Pearson married Laura Elizabeth Frederica Markham. They had two sons: Charles Lyons Markham Pearson and Richard Frederick Sydney Pearson.

Pearson retired from the army in 1864 with the rank of lieutenant-colonel. In 1881 he was appointed Assistant Commissioner of the Metropolitan Police. In June 1887, he was made a Companion of the Order of the Bath (CB). He was also a Justice of the Peace for Middlesex.

He died after a prolonged illness while still serving in the Metropolitan Police.

See also
 Lyons family

Sources
 
 
 
 

Grenadier Guards officers
Assistant Commissioners of Police of the Metropolis
Companions of the Order of the Bath
British Army personnel of the Crimean War
English justices of the peace
People educated at Eton College
Graduates of the Royal Military College, Sandhurst
1831 births
1890 deaths